Chinchilla Airport  is an airport serving Chinchilla, Queensland, Australia.

The airport is served by 2-3 weekday charter flights to Taroom and Brisbane operated by Skytrans Airlines with Dash-8-100 aircraft.

History 
Work commenced on the Chinchilla Aerodrome in 1967. Land for the facility was resumed in March and construction completed later that year. The first aircraft landed at the airport on 26 October 1967 and the facility was opened by Reginald Swartz two days later on 28 October 1967. The facility was initially opened with a gravel runway, which was later sealed in 1987.

Trans Australia Airlines (TAA) operated services from the airport from around its opening until the end of 1973.

References

Airports established in 1967
Airports in Queensland
Chinchilla, Queensland
1967 establishments in Australia